Tarakanovo is a rural locality (a selo) in Levinskoye Rural Settlement, Bolshesosnovsky District, Perm Krai, Russia. The population was 123 as of 2010. There are 4 streets.

Geography 
Tarakanovo is located 15 km east of Bolshaya Sosnova (the district's administrative centre) by road. Yuzhny is the nearest rural locality.

References 

Rural localities in Bolshesosnovsky District